Geoff Dey (born 11 January 1964) is an English former professional footballer who played as a midfielder.

Career
Dey began his career with Sheffield United, before moving to Scunthorpe United, where he made 17 appearances in the Football League. Dey later played non-league football for Worcester City.

Dey also participated at the 1981 FIFA World Youth Championship, making four appearances in the tournament.

References

1964 births
Living people
English footballers
Sheffield United F.C. players
Scunthorpe United F.C. players
Worcester City F.C. players
English Football League players
Footballers from Chesterfield
Association football midfielders